Celidomphax is a genus of moths in the family Geometridae.

Species
 Celidomphax prolongata Prout, 1915
 Celidomphax rubrimaculata (Warren, 1905)

References
 Celidomphax at Markku Savela's Lepidoptera and Some Other Life Forms
 Natural History Museum Lepidoptera genus database

Geometrinae